Jimmy Bertrand (February 24, 1900 – August 1960) was an American jazz and blues percussionist.

Background 
Bertrand was born in Biloxi, Mississippi, and was active on the Chicago blues and jazz scene of the 1920s. Bertrand recorded with Louis Armstrong, Johnny Dodds, Erskine Tate, and Blind Blake, amongst many others. In addition he led Jimmy Bertrand's Washboard Wizards. He was also a noted instructor; his pupils included Wallace Bishop, Lionel Hampton, and Big Sid Catlett. Bertrand died in Chicago in 1960.

References

External links
Jimmy Betrand and his Washboard Wizards at the Red Hot Jazz Archive

1900 births
1960 deaths
Blues musicians from Mississippi
American jazz drummers
American blues drummers
People from Biloxi, Mississippi
20th-century American drummers
American male drummers
Jazz musicians from Mississippi
20th-century American male musicians
American male jazz musicians